Frank G. Bonelli Regional Park is a man-made recreational area in San Dimas, California, United States, in Los Angeles County. It is near the Orange Freeway (State Route 57), the Foothill Freeway (Interstate 210) and the San Bernardino Freeway (Interstate 10). It is named after former LA County Supervisor Frank G. Bonelli.

The park contains a  lake called Puddingstone Reservoir, which provides a place for fishing, swimming, sailing, wind surfing, boating, and jet skiing, along with a waterfall.

Other recreation in the park includes kayak rentals (by Wheel Fun), RV campgrounds adjacent to the park (separate facility), six playgrounds, barbecues, hiking, biking, family picnic areas, and private picnic areas for company picnics, company parties, church picnics and other group events or gatherings. The private areas are run exclusively by James Events, which has a contract with Los Angeles County Parks and Recreation. However, families and small groups may contact the park directly to reserve other areas of the park.

The park is adjacent to one of the area's largest water parks, Raging Waters.

The park will host mountain biking at the 2028 Summer Olympics.

References

External links

 

Parks in Los Angeles County, California
Regional parks in California
San Gabriel Valley
San Dimas, California
Venues of the 2028 Summer Olympics
Olympic cycling venues